Paraburkholderia solitsugae is a Gram-negative bacterium belonging to the genus Paraburkholderia. The type strain, P. solitsugae 1NT, was isolated from the Arnot research forest at the same time as Paraburkholderia elongata, using agar medium supplemented with soil-extracted, solubilized organic matter. P. solitsugae was named after the 'soil of hemlock trees' from which it was isolated. According to the aforementioned studies, P. solitsugae is a fast-growing, metabolically-versatile bacteria and possesses the capability to degrade aromatic acids.

References 

solitsuga